The 2015 SWAC men's basketball tournament took place March 10–14 at the Toyota Center in Houston, Texas.

Format
Nine teams participated in the 2015 tournament. Alabama State was banned from postseason play due to failing to meet the NCAA's APR requirements. Southern was ineligible for the postseason due to failure to supply usable academic data to the NCAA. However, Southern and Alabama State did participate in the SWAC Tournament but could not qualify for the NCAA Tournament if they were to win the SWAC Tournament.

Arkansas–Pine Bluff did not participate in the tournament due to a postseason ban issued by the NCAA.

Schedule

*Game times in Central Time. #Rankings denote tournament seeding.

Bracket

* Ineligible for NCAA tournament play due to penalties.

References

SWAC men's basketball tournament
2014–15 Southwestern Athletic Conference men's basketball season